Devadhanam is a village in Thiruvallur District, Tamil Nadu, India.

References 
 http://www.tnrd.gov.in/databases/Villages.pdf
 http://indiabyroad.in/tag/devadanam/ 
 http://www.tiruvallur.tn.nic.in/pdf/2_Ponneri_BLO_List.pdf

Villages in Tiruvallur district